Murray Jack (born 21 July 1932) is a New Zealand cricketer. He played in four first-class matches for Canterbury from 1955 to 1958.

See also
 List of Canterbury representative cricketers

References

External links
 

1932 births
Living people
New Zealand cricketers
Canterbury cricketers
Cricketers from Timaru